The Rainbow Group in the European Parliament was a regionalist political group in the European Parliament from 1989 to 1994.

History
In 1989 the previous Rainbow Group split. For the third term of the European Parliament, the green parties formed The Green Group, whilst the regionalist parties stayed in the remaining Rainbow Group. 

This second Rainbow Group was the highpoint of the European Free Alliance (EFA) to that date.

But the 1994 elections saw a considerable reduction in Regionalist representation in the Parliament, with only the Canarian Coalition, Lega Nord, Scottish National Party and People's Union keeping their MEPs. But Lega Nord had been suspended from the EFA  following its decision to join the Italian coalition government alongside the right-wing 
National Alliance. The weakened EFA was no longer able to maintain their own group, and instead allied with members of the French Energie Radicale to form the Group of the European Radical Alliance.

Sources
"Regionalist Parties in Western Europe", de Winter & Türsan 1998 
Development of Political Groups in the European Parliament
Europe Politique
Democracy in the European Parliament
European Parliament MEP Archives

References

Former European Parliament party groups
Regionalism (politics)